Dallas: The Television Role-Playing Game is a role-playing game created by the wargame publisher Simulations Publications, Inc. (SPI) in 1980 based on the popular television soap opera Dallas. The game was an attempt by debt-ridden SPI to find a new audience, but the game did not sell well and also alienated their wargame clientele.

Description
Dallas, the second licensed role-playing game (after Star Trek: Adventure Gaming in the Final Frontier (1978) from Heritage Models), is a TV soap-opera/crime system in which the players take on the roles of major characters from the Dallas TV series, and interact with each other in "plots." Character abilities include power, persuasion, coercion, seduction, investigation, and luck; ability scores are compared and dice are rolled to determine the results of actions.

Components
The game box contains:
16-page "Rules of Play"
16-page "Scriptwriter's Guide" for the Director
 "Major Characters" booklet outlining the nine main characters
56 cards of secondary characters and organizations
 two six-sided dice

Gameplay
In addition to a player's main character, the player is dealt cards to give them control of a certain number of secondary characters and organizations. During the Conflict phase of each scene, players can attempt to take control of more secondary characters and organizations, using their powers of Power, Persuasion, Coercion, Seduction, Investigation and Chance. 

Three scenarios are included with the game; each is divided into "scenes" that each have three phases:
 Presentation: The Director explains the scene and adds new minor characters and organizations either directly to one or more players, or as "free" entities in the center of the table.
 Negotiation: Players have a limited time to have public or private discussions with other players, which can result in loans and/or agreements being made, and the exchange of money and cards.
Conflict: Players have an opportunity to take actions against other players, or take control of some of the "free" cards in the center of the table.
Unlike other role-playing games of the time, Victory Conditions are outlined in each script, and the player who has the most at the end of the scenario is the winner.

Publication history
In serious debt in 1980, SPI made an attempt to expand its customer base beyond its "hobbyist" core of wargamers by entering into a much-publicized arrangement with Lorimar Productions to produce the Dallas role-playing game. Dallas was designed by James F. Dunnigan, with art by Redmond A. Simonsen, and was published by SPI in October 1980 at the height of the "Who Shot J.R." craze.

Despite the popularity of the television show, the game proved to be an infamous failure, and art director Redmond Simonsen later remarked that the 80,000 copies printed "was about 79,999 more than anyone wanted."

Lawrence Schick, in his 1991 book Heroic Worlds: A History and Guide to Role-Playing Games, noted that not only did SPI not develop a new audience of gamers with Dallas, but the game also alienated SPI's traditional wargaming clientele: "As much a card game as a role-playing game, it was widely loathed by SPI's devoted following of wargamers."

Reception
In Issue 42 of The Space Gamer (August 1981), David Ladyman wasn't sure this game would find an audience, saying, "Is Dallas a useful bridge between gaming and your 'real world' friends?  That might depend on how many Dallas freaks you know that you would want to introduce to gaming. Hard core RPGers will probably want to add the game to their collection; characters' attributes and the conflict resolution system are novel enough, even if you have no interest in the television series. I wouldn't suggest it, though, if you buy your games for long-term playability - Dallas just doesn't have lasting entertainment value."

In the 2016 book Television: The Medium and Its Manners, Peter Conrad called the game "a ludic Dallas do-it-yourself kit. Dallas: The Television Role-Playing Game disassembles the series and parcels it up as sociological poker." Conrad noted, "When you tire of the scripts in the box, you can rig up your own. Since it's all a matter of shuffling and combining formulae, the possibilities are infinite."

Reviews
Games
Jeux & Stratégie #8

Other recognition
A copy of Dallas is held in the collection of the Strong National Museum of Play (object  110.3209).

References

Contemporary role-playing games
Jim Dunnigan games
Role-playing games based on television series
Role-playing games introduced in 1980
Simulations Publications games